Chalybeate waters, also known as ferruginous waters, are mineral spring waters containing salts of iron.

Name

Ferruginous comes from the Latin word  'of a rusty colour', from  'iron rust', from  'iron'.

History

Early in the 17th century, chalybeate water was said to have health-giving properties and many people once promoted its qualities. Dudley North, 3rd Baron North, discovered the chalybeate spring at Tunbridge Wells in 1606. His eldest son's physician said the waters contained "vitriol" and the waters of Tunbridge Wells could cure:

the colic, the melancholy, and the vapours; it made the lean fat, the fat lean; it killed flat worms in the belly, loosened the clammy humours of the body, and dried the over-moist brain.

He also apparently said, in verse:

:These waters youth in age renew
Strength to the weak and sickly add
Give the pale cheek a rosy hue
And cheerful spirits to the sad.

In 1689, a spring of ferruginous water rich in gas and tasting pleasantly was discovered by Count Lelio Piovene of Vicenza. Local residents called the water from this spring "Saint Anthony's miraculous water" believing it had therapeutic properties. This spring, known today as the Recoaro Spa, is located on the outskirts of Vicenza, in northeastern Italy.

John Radcliffe (1652–1714) discusses the benefits of various mineral waters in the chapter entitled "Of Chalybeat Waters" in his book Dr. Radcliffe's practical dispensatory : containing a complete body of prescriptions, fitted for all diseases, internal and external, digested under proper heads.

Anthony Relhan (c. 1715–1776), promoted the drinking of mineral waters and particularly water from the chalybeate spring in St Anne's Well Gardens, Hove and published A Short History of Brighthelmstone; with Remarks on its Air, an Analysis of its Waters, Particularly of an uncommon Mineral one, long discovered, though but lately used in 1761. This led to a substantial increase in public interest in drinking mineral water. The town of Enfield, New Hampshire, even changed its name temporarily to Relhan because of the profound public interest in this form of therapy.

Princess Victoria, later Queen Victoria, drank the waters every day during her stay in Tunbridge Wells in 1834. She and her mother, the Princess Victoria, Duchess of Kent, would pay a visit to the spring and then stroll along the Pantiles. The water contains a significant level of dissolved mineral salts, with iron and manganese contributing to its characteristic flavour.

The Spire Southampton Private Hospital in Chalybeate Close, Southampton, UK was formerly known as The Chalybeate Hospital until 2007.

Content of the chalybeate waters from Tunbridge Wells

An analysis in 1967 showed it to contain (parts per million):
Iron(II) carbonate, FeCO3 25.3
Manganese(II) carbonate, MnCO3 4.6
Calcium sulfate, CaSO4 60.9
Magnesium sulfate, MgSO4 13.4
Magnesium chloride, MgCl2 7.8
Sodium chloride, NaCl 57.2
Potassium chloride, KCl 7.3

Notable chalybeate springs

Chalybeate springs are found in:

Australia
The Chalybeate Spring at Mittagong, New South Wales

Belgium
 Malmedy

Germany
Bad Pyrmont

Italy
Recoaro, Vicenza

Ireland
Moydow Castle, Longford
Chalybeate Well, Garretstown Woods, Garretstown, Cork

Poland
Krynica-Zdrój

Romania
Toplitz

Russia
Lipetsk, in central Russia

Spain
Lanjarón, a village in the Alpujarras

Sweden
Ramlösa Hälsobrunn, in Helsingborg, Sweden

United Kingdom

England
Alexandra Park in Hastings, East Sussex
Balcombe, West Sussex
Bermondsey Spa, south-east of the Tower of London. Around 1770 Thomas Keyse opened some tea gardens. With the discovery of a chalybeate spring the gardens became known as Bermondsey Spa. About 1784 Keyse received a licence to "provide in his garden musical entertainments" like those in the Vauxhall Pleasure Gardens. They were varied by occasional exhibitions of fireworks and the price of admission was one shilling.
Burton upon Trent, at Sinai Park House 
Chalice Well, Glastonbury
Cheltenham, Gloucestershire
Chalybeate Kennels near Ingleborough, North Yorkshire
Dorton Spa in Buckinghamshire: said to contain four times the iron of Tunbridge Wells
Gilsland Spa, Cumbria
George Gap Spa, Great Fryup Dale, North Yorkshire
The Gloucester Spa, Gloucester
Griffydam, Leicestershire
Hampstead, North London
Harrogate, North Yorkshire
Kedleston Hall near Quarndon, Derbyshire
Kilburn, North London
Lees, Greater Manchester
Nill Well, between Yelling and Papworth Everard, Cambridgeshire
The Red Well, Knapwell, Cambridgeshire
Robin Hood Hills, Kirkby in Ashfield, Nottinghamshire
Royal Beulah Spa Upper Norwood, Surrey (now London Borough of Croydon)
St. Ann's Well Gardens, Hove, East Sussex
St. Blaise's Well, Bromley, London
St James Cemetery, Liverpool
Seend, Wiltshire
Somersham, Cambridgeshire
Sandrock Spring, Blackgang, Isle of Wight – discovered 1811; buried in landslide in 1978
Southwick, Northamptonshire
Spa Well, Spittal, Northumberland
Stamford, Lincolnshire
Tunbridge Wells, Kent
Tynemouth, Tyne and Wear – currently buried on Longsands beach
Winteringham, North Lincolnshire

Scotland
The Saltcoats Mineral Well, The Holm Plantation, North Ayrshire.
The Brow Well, Ruthwell - visited by the dying Robert Burns
The Chapeltoun Burn source near Stewarton, East Ayrshire
Fraserburgh, northeast Scotland
Hartfell Spa, near Moffat, in the upper reaches of Annandale, Dumfries and Galloway
Parson's Well, Drumoak, Aberdeenshire
Euchan Glen, Sanquhar, Dumfries and Galloway
Peterhead
Heavenly Aqua Well, West Linton, Scottish Borders
Red Well, Whitehills, Aberdeenshire
Queen Mary's Well, Berry Hill, Aberdeenshire

Wales
Ffynnon Goch, Aberaeron, Ceredigion
Betws Yn Rhos, Conwy
Llandrindod Wells, central Powys
Trefriw, Conwy
Trellech, Monmouthshire

United States
Beersheba Springs, Grundy County, Tennessee
Brandywine Springs, Wilmington, Delaware
Brushton, New York, a village in Franklin County
Chalybeate Springs, Lawrence County, Alabama
Chalybeate Springs in Gadsden, Alabama
Chalybeate Springs, Jeffersonville, Indiana; Resort and spa, 1800s, destroyed and buried by the Big Four Railroad in 1907
Chalybeate, Kentucky
Chalybeate Spring, Schooley's Mountain, Morris County, New Jersey; active resort and spa from the 1820s until the 1870s (spring source destroyed by road work in 1945)
Chalybeate Springs, North Carolina
Chalybeate spring and Chalybeate Springs Hotel near Bedford Springs in Bedford, Pennsylvania
Licton Springs, Seattle, Washington
 Iron Springs, Manitou Springs, Colorado
Saratoga Springs in Saratoga Springs, New York
Sharon Springs, a village in Schoharie County, New York
Spring Water Park in Williamston, South Carolina
Sweet Chalybeate Springs, Allegheny County, Virginia
Tahama Spring, Colorado Springs, Colorado
Tinton Falls, Monmouth County, New Jersey; still active, but fenced off by the township
The Greenbrier, White Sulphur Springs, West Virginia

Places named for chalybeate springs

Several places throughout the world have taken their name from similar springs, including:

Chalybeate Springs, Alabama, Lawrence County
Chalybeate, Mississippi
Chalybeate Springs, Kentucky
Chalybeate Springs, Georgia, Meriwether County
Chalybeate Springs, North Carolina, Harnett County
Chalybeate Springs, Virginia, Scott County
Chalybeate Springs, Winnsboro, Wood County, Texas
Hughes Springs, Cass County, Texas
Sweet Chalybeate, Alleghany County, Virginia
Chalybeate Spring Temple, Sharon Springs, New York
Chalybeate Street, Aberystwyth, Ceredigion, Wales, United Kingdom
Chalybeate Street (Ffynnon Goch), Aberaeron, Ceredigion, Wales

Notes

References

External links
Video footage of the Euchan Glen Chalybeate Well
Video footage of the Saltcoats Mineral Well

Iron
Liquid water
Spa waters